The Blue Serpent Clock egg is an Imperial Fabergé egg, one of a series of fifty-two jeweled eggs made under the supervision of Peter Carl Fabergé for the Russian Imperial Family. This egg features a clock and is a design that Fabergé copied for his Duchess of Marlborough egg in 1902. Most Fabergé scholarship published prior to 2008 assigned the egg's creation to 1887, although with some notable reservations due to inconsistencies between the Blue Serpent Clock egg and contemporary descriptions of the 1887 egg. The 2012 rediscovery of the 1887 Third Imperial Egg, announced to the world in March 2014, validates the theory that the Blue Serpent Clock was crafted and delivered in 1895 to the then Tsar of Russia, Nicholas II. It is currently owned by Prince Albert II and is held in Monaco.

Design
The crafting of this Imperial egg is credited to Michael Perkhin of Fabergé's shop. The egg stands on a base of gold that is painted in opalescent white enamel. The three panels of the base feature motifs of raised gold in four colors, representing the arts and sciences. A serpent, set with diamonds coils around the stand connecting the base to the egg and up toward its center. The serpent's head and tongue point to the hour which is indicated in Roman numerals on a white band that runs around the egg near the top. This band rotates within the egg to indicate the time, rather than the serpent rotating around the egg. This is the first of the Tsar Imperial Fabergé eggs to feature a working clock. The majority of the egg is enameled in translucent blue and has diamond-studded gold bands and designs ringing the top and bottom of the egg. On each side of the egg a sculpted gold handle arches up in a "C" shape, attached to the egg on the top near the apex and on the lower half of the egg, near the center. The Blue Serpent Clock Egg contains no sapphires, while descriptions for the 1887 egg from the Russian State Historical Archives, the 1917 inventory of confiscated imperial treasure and the 1922 transfer documents for the egg to be moved from the Anichkov Palace to the Sovnarkom all describe an egg containing sapphires (the Third Imperial Egg recovered in 2012 contains sapphires and consistently fits the descriptions associated with the 1887 egg).

Surprise
The working clock is considered the egg's "surprise".

History
It is not known when or how the Tsar ordered the Easter egg from Fabergé, but the Blue Serpent Clock Egg was presented to Maria Feodorovna by Tsar Nicholas II on Easter day, 1895. The egg was housed in the Anichkov Palace until the 1917 revolution. Along with the other Fabergé eggs in the palace, the Serpent Clock Egg was transferred to the Armory Palace of the Kremlin in mid-September 1917. In 1922, the egg was likely transferred to the Sovnarkom, where it was held until it was sold abroad to Michel Norman of the Australian Pearl Company.

Between 1922 and 1950, the egg was bought by Emanuel Snowman of Wartski, sold, and bought back by Wartski. The egg was sold again by Wartski on Christmas Eve 1972 to Stavros Niarchos for £64,103. It was then given in 1974 to Prince Rainier III of Monaco to honor his Silver Jubilee. The Prince was unaware of its imperial provenance until it was lent to an exhibition. Following the death of Rainier III in 2005, it was inherited by his son, Prince Albert II.

This Blue Serpent Clock Egg was long thought to be the 1887 Easter egg. However, recent research (2008-2014) has conclusively proved the egg to be that of 1895. Fabergé created a very similar egg in 1902, the Duchess of Marlborough Egg for Consuelo Vanderbilt. That clock egg is larger than the Blue Serpent Clock Egg and is enameled in a pink colour, rather than in blue.

See also
Objet d'art
Egg decorating

Notes

Sources

External links

 Mieks Fabergé Eggs

Imperial Fabergé eggs
1895 works
Fabergé clock eggs